Oleksandr Artemenko (born 19 January 1987 in Chernyshove, Rozdolne Raion, Crimea Oblast, Ukrainian SSR) was a Ukrainian football forward for FC Bukovyna Chernivtsi on loan from Tavriya Simferopol in the Ukrainian Premier League. He is a product of the Crimean football system.

External links 
Profile on Official Tavriya website 

Living people
People from Rozdolne Raion
Ukrainian footballers
Ukrainian footballers banned from domestic competitions
1987 births
Ukrainian Premier League players
FC Khimik Krasnoperekopsk players
SC Tavriya Simferopol players
FC Bukovyna Chernivtsi players
Association football forwards
FC TSK Simferopol players
FC Rubin Yalta players
FC Yevpatoriya players
FC Okean Kerch players
FC Kyzyltash Bakhchisaray players